Sounding a Mosaic is the second album from the Canadian rock band Bedouin Soundclash. The album was released on September 7, 2004. Recorded in Montreal and produced by Darryl Jenifer of Bad Brains, the album spawned the hit single "When the Night Feels My Song" which reached #1 on the Canada singles chart. The album had two more singles, "Shelter" and "Gyasi Went Home". The album was certified platinum by the CRIA with over 100,000 copies sold across Canada.

Track listing
All songs written by Bedouin Soundclash unless noted otherwise.
"When the Night Feels My Song" – 3:07
"Shelter" – 3:15
"Living in Jungles" – 2:26
"Money Worries" featuring Vernon Maytone (Maytone) – 3:58
"Gyasi Went Home" – 2:26
"Shadow of a Man" – 5:02
"Jeb Rand" – 5:02
"Criminal" – 4:21
"Murder on the Midnight Wire" – 3:58
"Music My Rock" – 3:24
"Rude Boy Don't Cry" – 2:53
"Immigrant Workforce" – 3:21
"Nothing to Say" – 3:43
"Money Worries (E-Clair Refix)" (Maytone, Bedouin Soundclash) – 4:08
"Rude Boy Abroad (Lazare Breakdub)" – 3:00

Singles 
 "When the Night Feels My Song"
 "Shelter"
 "Gyasi Went Home"

Credits 
 All songs written by Bedouin Soundclash except "Money Worries" written by Vernon Maytone.
 Produced by Darryl Jenifer
 Engineered by Greg Smith
 Recorded at DNA Studios, Montreal
 Mastered by Rod Shearer
 Artwork/Design by Jay Malinowski

Trivia 
 The song "Jeb Rand" is about the character (of the same name) from the 1947 film Pursued, starring Robert Mitchum as Jeb.
 The song "When the Night Feels My Song" is featured in a T-Mobile advert in the UK. (November 2006)
 The line 'Yuh nuh ready fi dis yet, boy' in Living in Jungles comes from the Tanya Stephens song "Yuh Nuh Ready Fi Dis Yet"
 The line 'Murderer, blood is on your shoulder' in Living in Jungles comes from the Buju Banton song "Murderer" and the line 'Walk like a champion, talk like a champion' comes from another Buju Banton song "Champion".  Both songs are found on Buju's 1995 album 'Til Shiloh

Charts

Singles

References 

2004 albums
Bedouin Soundclash albums